Jane Stanley (born 13 April 1964) is an English former international women's footballer. She represented England and spent much of her club career in Belgium, with Standard Fémina de Liège.

Club career
In 1989 Stanley turned professional, joining Belgian club Standard Fémina de Liège on a three-year contract worth a reported £100 per week.

International career
Martin Reagan gave Stanley her first appearance for England on 27 April 1986, in a 4–0 European Championship qualifying win over Republic of Ireland at Elm Park in Reading.

Honours
 Belgian Women's First Division (4): 1989–90, 1990–91, 1991–92, 1993–94
 Belgian Women's Cup (2): 1990, 1995

References

1964 births
Living people
English women's footballers
England women's international footballers
English expatriate women's footballers
Standard Liège (women) players
Expatriate women's footballers in Belgium
People from Filey
Footballers from North Yorkshire
Women's association football forwards